Margaret of Bavaria may refer to:

Margaret of Bavaria, Duchess of Slavonia (1321-1374)
Margaret of Bavaria, Duchess of Burgundy (1363-1423)
Margaret of Bavaria, Marchioness of Mantua (1442-1479)
Margaret of Bavaria, Electress Palatine (1456-1501)